The Clerk of the House of Commons is the chief executive of the House of Commons in the Parliament of the United Kingdom, and before 1707 of the House of Commons of England.

The formal name for the position held by the Clerk of the House of Commons is Under Clerk of the Parliaments. The chief clerk of the House of Lords is the Clerk of the Parliaments.

Appointment
The Clerk of the House is appointed by the sovereign by Letters Patent, in which they are styled "Under Clerk of the Parliaments [...] to attend upon the Commons". Before 1748, the Clerkship of the House of Commons could be purchased until Jeremiah Dyson (then Clerk of the House) ended the practice of purchase when he left the Clerkship.

Duties

The Clerk of the House is the principal constitutional adviser to the house, and adviser on all its procedure and business, including parliamentary privilege, and frequently appears before select and joint committees examining constitutional and parliamentary matters. As with all the members of the House Service, he is politically entirely impartial and is not a civil servant. Until 1 January 2008, when the reforms to the house's governance proposed by the Tebbit Review of management and services of the house were implemented, the clerk was the head of the Clerk's Department.
He sits at the table of the house, in the right-hand chair (the left-hand chair, looking towards the Speaker’s chair) for part of every sitting. The historic role of the clerks at the table is to record the decisions of the house (not what is said, which is recorded by Hansard). This they (but not the clerk) still do. The clerks at the table used to wear court dress with wing collar and white tie, a bob (barrister’s) wig and a silk gown. However, as of February 2017 the clerks will only have to wear gowns. For the State Opening of Parliament and other state occasions, the Clerk of the House wears full court dress with breeches, and a lace jabot and cuffs.

Incumbent
, the office is currently held by Sir John Benger, who replaced Sir David Natzler when he retired on 1 March 2019.

List of Clerks of the House of Commons

14th century
1363 – Robert de Melton
1385 – John de Scardeburgh

15th century
1414 – Thomas Haseley
1440 – John Dale
1461 – Thomas Bayen

16th century
1504 – Thomas Hylton
1510 – William Underhill
1515 – Robert Ormeston
1547 – John Seymour
1570 – Fulk Onslow

17th century
1603 – Ralph Ewens
1611 – William Pinches
1612 – John Wright
1639 – Henry Elsyng the younger
1649 – Henry Scobell
1658 – John Smythe
1659 – John Phelips
1659 – Thomas St. Nicholas
1660 – William Jessop
1661 – William Goldsborough
1678 – William Goldsborough the Younger
1683 – Paul Jodrell

18th century
1727 – Edward Stables
1732 – Nicholas Hardinge
1748 – Jeremiah Dyson
1762 – Thomas Tyrwhitt 
1768 – John Hatsell

19th century
1820 – John Henry Ley
1850 – Sir Denis Le Marchant, Bt
1871 – Sir Thomas Erskine May 
1886 – Sir Reginald Palgrave

20th century
1900 – Sir Archibald Milman 
1902 – Sir Courtenay Ilbert 
1921 – Sir Thomas Lonsdale Webster 
1930 – Sir Horace Dawkins 
1937 – Sir Gilbert Campion 
1948 – Sir Frederic Metcalfe 
1954 – Sir Edward Fellowes 
1962 – Sir Barnett Cocks 
1974 – Sir David Lidderdale 
1976 – Sir Richard Barlas 
1979 – Sir Charles Gordon 
1983 – Sir Kenneth Bradshaw 
1987 – Sir Clifford Boulton 
1994 – Sir Donald Limon 
1998 – Sir William McKay

21st century
2003 – Sir Roger Sands 
2006 – Sir Malcolm Jack 
2011 – Sir Robert Rogers 
2015 – Sir David Natzler  (acting 2014–2015)
2019 – Sir John Benger

References

External links
Information sheet – Clerk of the House – UK Parliament website
 Records of the Department of the Clerk of the House – UK Parliamentary Archives website
Records of the Office of the Clerk of the House - UK Parliamentary Archives website